Telsing Ngamjang Haokip is former Minister of Manipur and former president of the Manipur Pradesh Congress Committee. He has been consistently elected five times from  59 Saikot(ST) Assembly constituency in Churachandpur district, Manipur.

History
 Elected MLA from 59 Saikot(ST) A/C, 5th Manipur Legislative Assembly 1990
 Elected MLA from 59 Saikot(ST) A/C, 6th Manipur Legislative Assembly 1995
 Elected MLA from 59 Saikot(ST) A/C, 8th Manipur Legislative Assembly 2002
 Elected MLA from 59 Saikot(ST) A/C, 9th Manipur Legislative Assembly 2007
 Elected MLA from 59 Saikot(ST) A/C, 10th Manipur Legislative Assembly 2012
 Elected MLA from 59 Saikot(ST) A/C, 11th Manipur Legislative Assembly 2017
 President, Manipur Pradesh Congress Committee, since 2 April 2016.

References

Living people
Manipur politicians
Indian National Congress politicians from Manipur
Year of birth missing (living people)
Manipur MLAs 1990–1995
Manipur MLAs 1995–2000
Manipur MLAs 2002–2007
Manipur MLAs 2007–2012
Manipur MLAs 2012–2017
Manipur MLAs 2017–2022